John Simmons is an American politician and chiropractor serving as a member of the Missouri House of Representatives from the 109th district. Elected in November 2018, he assumed office in January 2019.

Early life and education 
Simmons was born in Avon, Connecticut. He earned a Bachelor of Science degree from Union College and a Doctor of Chiropractic from Logan University.

Career 
Simmons works as a chiropractor at the Simmons Wellness Center in Washington, Missouri. He was elected to the Missouri House of Representatives in November 2018 and assumed office in January 2019.

References 

Living people
American chiropractors
Republican Party members of the Missouri House of Representatives
People from Avon, Connecticut
People from Washington, Missouri
Union College (New York) alumni
Logan University alumni
Year of birth missing (living people)